Monster Jam is a live motorsport event tour operated by Feld Entertainment. The series began in 1992, and is sanctioned under the umbrella of the United States Hot Rod Association. Events are primarily held in North America, with some additional events in other countries. Although individual event formats can vary greatly based on the "intermission" entertainment, the main attraction is always the racing, two-wheel skills competition, and freestyle competitions by monster trucks.

Live events

Monster Jam events are held throughout the year in various venues around the U.S. and Canada. Events are generally held in the winter and early spring when professional football and southern baseball stadiums are generally dormant for their main purpose. Events have also been held in other locations around the world, including Europe, Australia, Mexico, Costa Rica, the Philippines, Saudi Arabia, Japan, and Singapore.

At Monster Jam events, monster trucks face off in three forms of competition: racing, two-wheel skills, and freestyle.

Racing is traditional heads-up tournament racing, where the first truck to cross the finish line moves onto the next round; the final race of the night is for that particular event's championship.

The two-wheel skills competition was introduced in late 2017. This competition consists of trucks performing their best moves on two wheels for two attempts. They can also choose to perform donuts or cyclones as an alternative. The two-wheel skills winner is determined by attendees voting via a score tracking website. The truck with the highest score at the end of the event wins that particular competition.

The freestyle competition allows drivers two minutes (one-and-a-half minutes for arena shows) on an open floor to show off their skills as they drive the trucks over ramps and junked cars, performing stunts and tricks with their trucks. In 2020, Monster Jam introduced a rule in which a truck must complete 30 seconds to qualify for an eligible score. If they fail to do so, they will receive a score of 0. The freestyle winner is determined by attendees voting via a score tracking website. The truck with the highest score at the end of the event wins the competition.

Each event produces its own winner. This winner is determined by the truck that has the most points gained in that particular event at the end of that event. If the same driver wins all three events in the same night, they are considered as "Doubling Down" in the event.

Between the main competitions, other events are held. In the Triple Threat Series and Arena Series, the "donut" competition is featured, in which a driver tries to spin their truck until the driver or truck is unable to continue, or until the driver thinks they have a high enough score to win. Also presented at Triple Threat Series events are ATV racing, speedster racing, and speedster obstacle course competitions. 

In 2019 Freestanding crush cars were officially removed from Monster Jam events.

Tours
From 2000 to 2018, Monster Jam's competitive season began in January and ended in March, with the World Finals in Las Vegas every year, with exhibition shows continuing into the summer and fall months. Since 2019, the season still begins in January, but now ends in May with the World Finals held in Orlando, with exhibition shows continuing until the end of the year. The tours visit many major cities in the United States, Canada, Europe, South America, Central America, South Africa, and Australia.

In 2015, an arena tour debuted. This tour featured 8 drivers driving 3 different vehicles in a points series. The top two finishers received an invitation to the Monster Jam World Finals 16. Also in 2015, Monster Jam started its first stadium tour. This tour followed 16 drivers each weekend on Fox Sports 1 competing for points in qualifying, racing, obstacle course racing and freestyle. The top four in the series received invitations to the Monster Jam World Finals 16. In 2016, the arena series was split into two series, east and west, with the winner of each tour getting an invitation to Monster Jam World Finals 17. Since then the number of regional tours has increased, both for stadium and arena tours.

In 2022, the Monster Jam calendar featured three arena tours with 8 drivers each; each tour's winner receives a spot at the Monster Jam World Finals XXI in Orlando. The schedule also includes two stadium tours, each with 14 drivers competing for one spot in Monster Jam World Finals XXI.

Following the World Finals, additional exhibition tours are held through much of the rest of the year. These traditionally included stadium tours in northern cities where it is too cold during the main season to hold outdoor events, which were known as the "Path of Destruction" tour. With the expansion of the competitive season to May, these events now comprise the late-season stops of the regular stadium tours.

Monster Jam World Finals

The Monster Jam World Finals are the culmination of the Monster Jam winter season, featuring top drivers from the year. It is often referred to as the "Super Bowl of monster trucks" and features drivers competing for the racing and freestyle championships.

For the first 19 World Finals, the event was held annually at Sam Boyd Stadium in Las Vegas, Nevada. On February 15, 2018, a new format was announced where the World Finals would rotate venues annually, beginning with World Finals XX. The original location for World Finals XX was set to be MetLife Stadium in East Rutherford, New Jersey, but it was later changed to Camping World Stadium in Orlando, Florida due to scheduling issues.

World Finals XXI was scheduled for May 2–3, 2020, at Camping World Stadium. The event was later cancelled due to public health concerns regarding the international coronavirus pandemic. This is the first time that a Monster Jam World Finals event has been cancelled.

Hall of Fame
On January 8, 2020, Monster Jam announced that they would be establishing a Hall of Fame, dedicated to honor those who, "have made immeasurable contributions to the sport". Dennis Anderson, creator and former driver of Grave Digger, and Scott Douglass, longtime announcer of Monster Jam events, were announced as the inaugural class of the new Hall of Fame at a live event at Raymond James Stadium on January 11, 2020. Originally set to be inducted at a ceremony during the weekend of World Finals XXI, the induction was held on February 27, 2021 during halftime of a show at Camping World Stadium.

On February 28, 2021, it was announced that Gary Porter, creator of Carolina Crusher and former driver of Grave Digger, and Mike Wales, former Senior Director of Fleet Operations, would be inducted as part of the Hall of Fame 2021 Class. Porter and Wales were inducted during a show at NRG Stadium on October 23, 2021.

Licensing 

Mattel's Hot Wheels brand produced officially licensed toy versions of monster trucks under the Monster Jam name. They also sponsored a monster truck that competed in the series in previous years. Monster Jam and Mattel's contract ended in 2018. Monster Jam toys have been produced by Spin Master since January 2019.

Nine officially licensed Monster Jam video games have been produced. The first two, Monster Jam: Maximum Destruction, a vehicular combat game, and Monster 4x4: Masters of Metal, an arcade racing game, were published by Ubisoft. The third, titled simply Monster Jam, was released by Activision on November 13, 2007, and a sequel to it titled Monster Jam: Urban Assault was released on October 28, 2008. A fifth game, Monster Jam: Path of Destruction, was released on November 9, 2010. On June 17, 2015 Monster Jam Battlegrounds was released as a download on Xbox Live and Steam. Monster Jam: Crush It! was released on Xbox One and PlayStation 4 on October 25, 2016, and was later released on Nintendo Switch on October 31, 2017. On June 25, 2019, Monster Jam Steel Titans was released on the PlayStation 4, PC, Xbox One, and Nintendo Switch. A sequel, Monster Jam Steel Titans 2, was released on March 2, 2021, for the same platforms as the first game.

Traxxas released a series of radio controlled former and current Monster Jam monster trucks, including Bigfoot, Grave Digger or Monster Mutt.

Media coverage

In the United States, Monster Jam originally aired on TNN and Speed, with season preview and World Finals recap packages occasionally airing on CBS as part of the CBS Sports Spectacular from 2007 to 2012. From 2014 to 2018, FS1 and FS2 aired events form the series. Beginning in 2019, NBC Sports started airing the show on NBCSN. On February 15, 2023, it was announced that Monster Jam would be moving to MAVTV with a multi-year deal.

Recaps from each event are posted on Monster Jam's official YouTube account the following week. In 2020, during the international coronavirus pandemic, Monster Jam began posting hour-long recaps of previous events recorded in 2019 and 2020, such as the 2019 All-Star Challenge. In 2020, Monster Jam introduced a subscription membership program for YouTube featuring videos of past events. New membership videos are posted each week.

References

External links
 Monster Jam's Official Website

Monster truck promoters and sanctioning bodies
Monster truck television shows
Feld Entertainment